Jacob Weager (September 26, 1755 - July 10, 1827) was a farmer and political figure in Upper Canada. He represented Dundas in the Legislative Assembly of Upper Canada from 1800 to 1804.

Jacob Weager, was a British Army Captain and Upper Canadian politician. He was born in the Rhinebeck, Dutchess County, Province of New York, the son of Everhart Weager and married to Mary Hare in 1784. He served in the King's Loyal Regiment of New York during the American Revolution. Weager married Mary Hare, the daughter of Henry Hare of the Indian Department. He lived in Williamsburgh Township. Weager served in the Dundas County Militia, reaching the rank of captain, and was a justice of the peace in the Eastern District.

Weager died in Dundas in 1827.

References

Further reading 
Johnson, JK Becoming Prominent: Regional Leadership in Upper Canada, 1791–1841 (1989)  p. 234

1756 births
1827 deaths
Members of the Legislative Assembly of Upper Canada
Canadian Militia officers
United Empire Loyalists
Canadian people of German descent